Cuvântul Liber (Romanian for "The Free Word") is the name of several Romanian newspapers:

 Cuvântul Liber (1924) - weekly published by Eugen Filotti (1924–1925)
 Cuvântul Liber (1933) - weekly published by Tudor Teodorescu-Braniște (1933–1936)
 Cuvântul Liber (Hunedoara) - contemporary newspaper published in Hunedoara
 Cuvântul Liber (Târgu Mureș) - contemporary newspaper published in Târgu Mureș
 Cuvântul Liber (Leova) - contemporary newspaper published in Leova